Jeppesen is a Danish patronymic surname meaning "son of Jeppe", which is a Western Danish parallel form of the biblical given name Jacob. A slightly abbreviated form is Jepsen (alternatively Jebsen). The equivalent Eastern Danish form of Jacob is Ib resulting in the patronymic surname Ibsen (rarely Ipsen).

People with the surname include:
 Carl Jeppesen (1858–1930), Danish-born Norwegian newspaper editor and politician
 Elrey Borge Jeppesen (1907–1996), aviation pioneer of navigational maps and charts
 Hans Nielsen Jeppesen (1815–1883), Danish merchant and ship-owner
 Jørn Jeppesen (1919–1964), Danish stage and film actor
 Knud Jeppesen (1892–1974), Danish composer, musicologist and writer
 Lars Krogh Jeppesen (born 1979), Danish handball player
 Lis Jeppesen (born 1956), Danish ballet dancer
 Martin Jeppesen (born 1970), Danish veteran football player
 Steven Jeppesen (born 1984), Danish-born Swedish golfer
 Travis Jeppesen (born 1979), American novelist and poet

See also
Jebsen (disambiguation)
Jepsen
Jepson (disambiguation)
Ibsen (disambiguation)
Bodil Ipsen

Danish-language surnames
Patronymic surnames

de:Jeppesen